The , also known as the Kasuga Taisha Garden, is a botanical garden located next to the Kasuga Shrine at 160 Kasugano-cho, Nara, Nara, Japan.

The garden opened in 1932, and is a Manyo Botanical Garden containing all plants (over 300 species) mentioned in the Man'yōshū, each labeled with its name and poems that mention it. The site also contains a Wisteria Garden, Camellia Garden, Iris Garden, and a Five Grain Garden which collects grain plants used for food, textiles, or dyes in Man'yōshū times.

Manyo Gagaku Performance Festival 
The Manyo Gagaku Performance Festival is celebrated around "Culture Day" at the Manyo Botanical Garden. The event aims to increase appreciation for gagaku. It takes place on the garden's floating stage.

See also 
 List of botanical gardens in Japan

References 

Manyo Gagaku Performance Festival, 文化の日萬葉雅楽会

Botanical gardens in Japan
Gardens in Nara Prefecture